The Central Bucks School District or CBSD is located in the Commonwealth of Pennsylvania, and is the third largest school district in Pennsylvania.  The district covers the Boroughs of Chalfont, Doylestown and New Britain and Buckingham Township, Doylestown Township, Plumstead Township, Warrington Township, Warwick Township, and most of New Britain Township, in Bucks County.  It consists of fifteen elementary schools, five middle schools, and three high schools. Its current superintendent is Abram Lucabaugh, Ed.D.

Elementary schools 

There are fifteen functioning elementary schools in CBSD:
Bridge Valley Elementary School (2004, Trailblazers)
Buckingham Elementary School (1955, Knights)
Cold Spring Elementary School (1995, Jaguars)
Doyle Elementary School (1966, Soaring Eagles)
Gayman Elementary School (1961, Mustangs)
Groveland Elementary School (2000, Great Grizzlies)
Jamison Elementary School (1997, Jets)
John Barclay Elementary School (1965, Patriots)
Linden Elementary School (1966, Leopards)
Mill Creek Elementary School (2000, Magic)
Paul W. Kutz Elementary School (1966, Cougars)
Pine Run Elementary School (1971, Owls)
Simon Butler Elementary School (1964, Bears)
Titus Elementary School (1957, Tigers)
Warwick Elementary School (1919, Bears)

Middle schools 

There are five middle schools:
Holicong Middle School (1971, Colonials)
Lenape Middle School (1957, Indians)
Tamanend Middle School (1961, Tigers)
Tohickon Middle School (2002, Golden Eagles)
Unami Middle School (1965, Warriors)

High schools 

 Central Bucks High School West ("C.B. West", established in 1952 as Central Bucks High School, located in Doylestown, mascot is Bucks)
 Central Bucks High School East ("C.B. East", established in 1969, located in Buckingham, mascot is Patriots)
 Central Bucks High School South ("C.B. South", established in 2004, located in Warrington, mascot is Titans)

All three Central Bucks high schools have consistently ranked among the best in Pennsylvania, and in 2019, each was ranked in the top 50, according to U.S. News & World Report.

Curriculum 

Central Bucks has an integrated curriculum grade by grade.

Computer Sciences (QUEST), introduced in 1st grade
Family and Consumer Sciences, introduced in 7th and 8th grade
Health and Physical Education, introduced in 1st
Integrated Technology, introduced in 7th grade
Innovation and Creativity (InC), introduced in 7th grade
Language Arts, introduced in Kdg
Library, introduced in Kdg and integrated in 1st grade
Mathematics, introduced in Kdg and integrated in 1st grade
Music, introduced in 1st grade
Reading, introduced in Kdg
Science, introduced in 2nd grade
Social Studies, introduced in 1st grade
Visual Arts, introduced in 1st
World Languages, introduced in 8th grade

Community School 

The district controls the Central Bucks Community School – a school for children in the summer. It offers camps for children and second learning opportunities as well as before and afterschool child care programs at the elementary schools.

CBTV 

Central Bucks Television, CBTV, was launched in the spring of 2006. CBTV is managed by Central Bucks School District in cooperation with the James A. Michener Art Museum and the Mercer Museum of the Bucks County Historical Society. The mission of CBTV is to provide the Central Bucks community with educational television programming featuring an emphasis on the area's heritage, arts, cultural life and accomplishments of the students and teachers in our public schools. Some shows include Parent Connections, High School Highlights, World of Guitar, and the Local Scene. Most of the shows are produced and filmed by students at the district's three high schools. It can be seen on Comcast Channel 28 and Verizon FIOS Channel 40. Direct TV does not currently carry CBTV.

References

External links 
Central Bucks School District
CBTV

School districts in Bucks County, Pennsylvania